The First Cemetery of Athens (Próto Nekrotafeío Athinón) is the official cemetery of the City of Athens and the first to be built. It opened in 1837 and soon became a prestigious cemetery for Greeks and foreigners.
The cemetery is located behind the Temple of Olympian Zeus and the Panathinaiko Stadium in central Athens. It can be found at the top end of Anapafseos Street (Eternal Rest Street). It is a large green space with pines and cypresses.

In the cemetery there are three churches. The main one is the Church of Saint Theodores and there is also a smaller one dedicated to Saint Lazarus. The third church of Saint Charles is a Catholic church. The cemetery includes several impressive tombs such as those of Heinrich Schliemann, designed by Ernst Ziller; Ioannis Pesmazoglou; Georgios Averoff; and one tomb with a famous sculpture of a dead young girl called I Koimomeni ("The Sleeping Girl") and sculpted by Yannoulis Chalepas from the island of Tinos.  There are also burial areas for Protestants and Jews, however, this segregation is not compulsory.

The cemetery is under the Municipality of Athens and is declared an historical monument.

Notable interments
 Odysseas Androutsos, hero of the Greek War of Independence
 George Averoff, philanthropist, businessman
 Sotiria Bellou, singer
 Nikolaos Bourandas, police and fire service general, politician
 Yannoulis Chalepas, sculptor
 Christodoulos, Archbishop of Athens
 Chrysostomos II, Archbishop of Athens
 Richard Church, general
 Jules Dassin, director, actor
 Stratos Dionysiou, singer
 Dorotheus, Archbishop of Athens
 Odysseas Elytis, poet, 1979 Nobel Laureate in literature
 Demetrios Farmakopoulos, painter
 George Finlay, historian
 Adolf Furtwängler, archaeologist
 Dimitris Horn, actor
 Humphrey Jennings, filmmaker
 Georgios Kafantaris, Prime Minister of Greece
 Dimitrios Kallergis, statesman
 Konstantinos Kanaris, hero of the Greek War of Independence, admiral, statesman
 Tzeni Karezi, actress
 Manos Katrakis, actor
 Nikos Kavvadias, poet
 Stelios Kazantzidis, singer
 Theodoros Kolokotronis, pre-eminent leader of the Greek War of Independence, general
 Marika Kotopouli, actress
 Ellie Lambeti, actress
 Grigoris Lambrakis, politician
 Zoe Laskari, actress
 Vassilis Logothetidis, actor
 Yannis Makriyannis, merchant, military officer, politician, author
 Orestis Makris, actor
 Manolis Mantakas, army officer, and politician
 Alexandros Mavrokordatos, politician
 Melina Mercouri, actress, politician
 Andreas Michalakopoulos, politician
 Dimitris Mitropanos, singer
 Dimitri Mitropoulos, conductor, pianist, composer
 Nikitaras, hero of the Greek War of Independence
 Kostis Palamas, poet
 Alexandros Panagoulis, politician, poet, democracy activist
 Antonios Papadakis, University of Athens' greatest benefactor
 Georgios Papadopoulos, military dictator during the Regime of the Colonels
 Andreas Papandreou, Prime Minister of Greece
 George Papandreou, Prime Minister of Greece
 Kalliroi Parren, feminist
 Katina Paxinou, actress
 George Polk, American journalist murdered during the Greek Civil War
 Alexandros Rizos Rangavis, poet
 Demis Roussos, singer
 Alekos Sakellarios, director, screenwriter, lyricist
 Rita Sakellariou, singer
 Spyros Spyromilios, military officer
 Dimitris Papamichael, actor and director
 Alexandros Papanastasiou, lawyer
 Christos Sartzetakis, President of Greece
 Heinrich Schliemann, amateur archaeologist who excavated the site of Troy
 Sophia Schliemann, his second wife, philanthropist
 Giorgos Seferis, poet
 Seraphim, Archbishop of Athens
 Angelos Sikelianos, poet
 Michael Tositsas, benefactor
 Charilaos Trikoupis, Prime Minister of Greece
 Vassilis Tsitsanis, rebetiko composer
 Ioannis Varvakis, member of Filiki Eteria
 Thanasis Veggos, actor
 Sofia Vembo, singer

 Aliki Vougiouklaki, actress
 T.H. White, author
 Emmanuil Xanthos, a founder of the Filiki Eteria
 Nikos Xilouris, singer and composer
 Nikos Zachariadis, politician, General Secretary of the Communist Party of Greece (KKE) from 1931 to 1956
 Napoleon Zervas, Hellenic Army officer and WWII resistance leader
 Ernst Ziller, architect
 Xenophon Zolotas, Prime Minister of Greece

Gallery

References

 Papyrus Larousse Britannica, 2006

External links
 
 

Cemeteries in Greece
National cemeteries
Eastern Orthodox cemeteries
Roman Catholic cemeteries
Anglican cemeteries in Europe
Lutheran cemeteries
Buildings and structures in Athens
Tourist attractions in Athens
1837 establishments in Greece